Shell Lake National Wildlife Refuge is a  National Wildlife Refuge in the U.S. state of North Dakota. Though wildlife viewing is allowed, hunting and fishing are prohibited.  The refuge is managed by the Lostwood Wetland Management District.

References

External links
 Shell Lake National Wildlife Refuge

Protected areas of Mountrail County, North Dakota
National Wildlife Refuges in North Dakota
Easement refuges in North Dakota